Haplophyton crooksii is a plant species native to Arizona, New Mexico, Texas, and northern Mexico. It is an herb up to 60 cm tall, with showy yellow flowers, found on rocky slopes in desert scrub and desert grassland.

The plant is commonly called the cockroach plant (or hierba de la cucaracha) because of its insecticidal properties.

References

Rauvolfioideae
Flora of Chihuahua (state)
Flora of Sonora
Flora of Mexico
Flora of New Mexico
Flora of Arizona
Flora of Texas